Crowle may refer to:

Places
 Crowle, Lincolnshire, England
 Crowle, Worcestershire, England

People
 Alfred C. Crowle, Cornish manager of the Mexican football team.